Ramesh Prasad may refer to:

 Akkineni Ramesh Prasad, Indian businessman, film producer and film executive
 Ramesh Prasad (cricketer), Indian cricketer